Temsamane (Tarifit: Temsaman, ⵜⴻⵎⵙⴰⵎⴰⵏ, Arabic:  تمسمان) is a commune in the Driouch Province of the Oriental administrative region of Morocco. At the time of the 2004 census, the commune had a total population of 14,937 people living in 2,928 households.

Towns and villages

 IBOUIJADEN

References

Populated places in Driouch Province
Rural communes of Oriental (Morocco)